Quilty is an Irish family name which has spread throughout the English-speaking world.

Origins and history
The name "Quilty" is an Anglicized form of the ancient Gaelic name of "Caoilte" (pronounced: Kweelteh).  There was a mythic Celtic warrior (c. 3rd Century A.D.) by the name of Caílte mac Rónáin, who was a member of the Fianna and the nephew of Fionn mac Cumhaill.  According to legend he lived long enough to be baptized by St. Patrick (c.389-461). The book "If You're A Wee Bit Irish: a chart of old Irish families collected from folk tradition" by William Durning (1978) recounts an alleged ancestry of Caoilte back to Adam. James Joyce (1882–1941) in chapter twelve of his masterpiece, Ulysses, (1922) has "The tribe of Caolte" as one of the twelve tribes of Ireland in a biblical parallel to the twelve tribes of Israel. Quilty is also a small town in County Clare Ireland, though this quilty is an anglicization of a different Irish word "coillte" meaning "woods". The name is considered a sept of the dynastic Dál gCais of the Kingdom of Thomond, and has the motto "Lámh Ládir an Nachtar" meaning "the strong hand uppermost."

There are various spellings of the name: Caoilte, Caolte, and Cuallta in Gaelic, and Kielty, Kealty, Keelty, Keilty, Kelty, Kilty, and Quilty (with or without an O' or Mc or Mac) in English. The most common variants are Kielty and Quilty. The name is possibly a derivation of caol meaning slender.

In 1850 there were over 75 families bearing the name of "Quilty" in Ireland, over half of them in County Limerick. As of 2005, there were about 300 families bearing the name of "Quilty" in the United States alone, almost half them in the northeast, with the highest concentrations in the states of Massachusetts, New York, Florida, Illinois, and California.

Notable people with the surname 
 Andrew Quilty, Australian photographer, cousin of Ben
Ben Quilty (born 1973), Australian painter
Johnny Quilty (1921–1969), Canadian ice hockey player
Michelle Quilty (1990–), Irish camogie player
Sean Quilty (1966–2022), Australian Olympic marathon runner
Sylvester "Silver" Quilty (1891–1976), Canadian football player
Tom Quilty (1887–1979), Australian station owner, philanthropist and poet
Tim Quilty, Australian politician.

Fictional characters with the name Quilty

Bridie Quilty, protagonist in the film I See a Dark Stranger (1941), played by Deborah Kerr
Clare Quilty, a fictional character in the 1955 novel Lolita by Vladimir Nabokov

Other uses of the name Quilty
Places
Quilty, County Clare, is a village on the west coast of Ireland
Quilty Nunataks, a geographic feature of Antarctica named for geologist Patrick Quilty
In music
Quilty was an Irish folk group named after the Clare village, mainly hailing from County Londonderry, who released one album entitled "Music of Ireland" through Arfolk/Escalibur in 1979.
Clare Quilty is a rock group from Virginia, USA, named for the character from Lolita
In fiction
The Quilties are a fictional race in the novel The Gnome King of Oz by Ruth Plumly Thompson
Media
Quilty was an American magazine published by F+W between 2011 and 2018.

References

External links
Quilty Family Genealogy Forum
Kielty Clan Association Website

Septs of the Dál gCais